Texas Creek, Colorado is an unincorporated community at the junction of U.S. Highway 50 and State Highway 69 in Fremont County, Colorado, United States.

See also
Texas Creek (disambiguation)

References

Unincorporated communities in Fremont County, Colorado
Unincorporated communities in Colorado